Topoľovka is a village and municipality in Humenné District in the Prešov Region of north-east Slovakia.

History
In historical records the village was first mentioned in 1479.

Geography
It has a population of about 825 people.

International relations

Twin towns — Sister cities
Topoľovka is twinned with:
 Bukowsko, Poland

External links
 
 
http://www.statistics.sk/mosmis/eng/run.html

Villages and municipalities in Humenné District